The μ-law algorithm (sometimes written mu-law, often approximated as u-law) is a companding algorithm, primarily used in 8-bit PCM digital telecommunication systems in North America and Japan. It is one of two versions of the G.711 standard from ITU-T, the other version being the similar A-law. A-law is used in regions where digital telecommunication signals are carried on E-1 circuits, e.g. Europe.

Companding algorithms reduce the dynamic range of an audio signal. In analog systems, this can increase the signal-to-noise ratio (SNR) achieved during transmission; in the digital domain, it can reduce the quantization error (hence increasing the signal-to-quantization-noise ratio). These SNR increases can be traded instead for reduced bandwidth for equivalent SNR.

Algorithm types
The μ-law algorithm may be described in an analog form and in a quantized digital form.

Continuous

For a given input , the equation for μ-law encoding is

It is important to note that the range of this function is −1 to 1.

μ-law expansion is then given by the inverse equation:

Discrete
The discrete form is defined in ITU-T Recommendation G.711.

G.711 is unclear about how to code the values at the limit of a range (e.g. whether +31 codes to 0xEF or 0xF0).
However, G.191 provides example code in the C language for a μ-law encoder. The difference between the positive and negative ranges, e.g. the negative range corresponding to +30 to +1 is −31 to −2. This is accounted for by the use of 1's complement (simple bit inversion) rather than 2's complement to convert a negative value to a positive value during encoding.

Implementation
The μ-law algorithm may be implemented in several ways:
Analog Use an amplifier with non-linear gain to achieve companding entirely in the analog domain.
Non-linear ADC Use an analog-to-digital converter with quantization levels which are unequally spaced to match the μ-law algorithm.
Digital Use the quantized digital version of the μ-law algorithm to convert data once it is in the digital domain.

Software/DSP
Use the continuous version of the μ-law algorithm to calculate the companded values.

Usage justification 
μ-law encoding is used because speech has a wide dynamic range. In analog signal transmission, in the presence of relatively constant background noise, the finer detail is lost. Given that the precision of the detail is compromised anyway, and assuming that the signal is to be perceived as audio by a human, one can take advantage of the fact that the perceived acoustic intensity level or loudness is logarithmic by compressing the signal using a logarithmic-response operational amplifier (Weber-Fechner law). In telecommunications circuits, most of the noise is injected on the lines, thus after the compressor, the intended signal is perceived as significantly louder than the static, compared to an uncompressed source. This became a common solution, and thus, prior to common digital usage, the μ-law specification was developed to define an interoperable standard.

This pre-existing algorithm had the effect of significantly lowering the amount of bits required to encode a recognizable human voice in digital systems. A sample could be effectively encoded using μ-law in as little as 8 bits, which conveniently matched the symbol size of the majority of common computers.

μ-law encoding effectively reduced the dynamic range of the signal, thereby increasing the coding efficiency while biasing the signal in a way that results in a signal-to-distortion ratio that is greater than that obtained by linear encoding for a given number of bits.

The μ-law algorithm is also used in the .au format, which dates back at least to the SPARCstation 1 by Sun Microsystems as the native method used by the /dev/audio interface, widely used as a de facto standard for sound on Unix systems. The au format is also used in various common audio APIs such as the classes in the sun.audio Java package in Java 1.1 and in some C# methods.

This plot illustrates how μ-law concentrates sampling in the smaller (softer) values. The horizontal axis represents the byte values 0-255 and the vertical axis is the 16-bit linear decoded value of μ-law encoding.

Comparison with A-law
The μ-law algorithm provides a slightly larger dynamic range than the A-law at the cost of worse proportional distortions for small signals. By convention, A-law is used for an international connection if at least one country uses it.

See also
 Audio level compression
 Signal compression (disambiguation)
 G.711
 Tapered floating point

References

External links
 Waveform Coding Techniques – details of implementation
 A-Law and mu-Law Companding Implementations Using the TMS320C54x (PDF)
 TMS320C6000 μ-Law and A-Law Companding with Software or the McBSP (PDF)
 A-law and μ-law realisation (in C)

Audio codecs
ITU-T recommendations